The following timeline of British military aviation covers the military aviation activities of the British Armed Forces from its origins in the 19th century to the present day:

1863 - Henry Coxwell demonstrates tethered balloon ascents to British Army personnel at Aldershot
1878 - Balloon experiments are conducted at the Royal Arsenal, Woolwich
1880 - a balloon section takes part in the Army's manoeuvres at Aldershot
1882
a balloon section takes part again in the Aldershot manoeuvres
The Balloon Equipment Store at Woolwich is moved to the School of Military Engineering at Chatham
1882 to 1884 - A balloon factory, depot and training school are established at Chatham
1884 - Three balloons, two officers and 15 other ranks take part in the Bechuanaland Expedition
1885 Balloons are used during the Sudan expedition
1890 The Balloon Section is established as an official unit of the Royal Engineers
c. 1894 The balloon factory is moved to south Farnborough
1899 to 1902 Balloons are used in the South African War
Balloons used to direct the fire of the British Artillery at Magersfontein
Balloons used to direct the fire of the British Artillery at the Battle of Lombard's Kop
1905 The balloon factory is moved to a better site
1906 Samuel Franklin Cody is appointed the balloon school's Chief Instructor in Kiting
1907 The British Army airship, Nulli Secundus, is completed
1908 The first British heavier-than-air military flight takes place when the British Army Aeroplane No. 1 flies
1909 The War Office halts all work on aircraft at Farnborough on cost grounds
1911 The S. E. 1 and the B.E. 1 are built at Farnborough under the pretext of repairing existing aircraft
1 April The Balloon Section of the Royal Engineers becomes the Air Battalion
1912
13 May - The Royal Flying Corps is established from the Air Battalion
1914
1 July - The Royal Naval Air Service, having previously broken away from the Royal Flying Corps, is officially recognized
13 August - The first RFC aircraft arrive in France
27 August - The first RNAS aircraft arrive in Ostend
1918
1 April - The Royal Air Force is established by merging the Royal Flying Corps and the Royal Naval Air Service
1924
1 April - The Royal Air Force establishes its Fleet Air Arm, consisting of RAF units normally embarked on aircraft carriers and fighting ships
1937
14 May - The Fleet Air Arm is placed under Admiralty control
1940
November - The Battle of Taranto, the Fleet Air Arm launched the first all-aircraft naval attack in history
1941
21 December - The British Army regains an aviation element as the Glider Pilot Regiment is formed.
1942
24 February - The Glider Pilot Regiment is formally inaugurated as part of the Army Air Corps
1999
5 October - Joint Helicopter Command is formed
2000
1 April - Joint Force Harrier is formed

See also
Timeline of the Royal Air Force
History of air traffic control in the United Kingdom

British history timelines
British military aviation
Aviation timelines